The Alice Hunt Bartlett Prize was awarded by the Poetry Society of London for a collection of poetry.  It is named after Alice Hunt Bartlett who was the American editor of the society's Poetry Review from 1923 to 1949.  The prize was established in 1966.

Winners
 1966: Gavin Bantock for Christ: A Poem in 26 parts and Paul Roche for All Things Considered
 1967: Ted Walker for The Solitaires: Poems 1964-65
 1968: Gael Turnbull for A Trampoline: Poems 1952–64
 1969: Tom Raworth for The Relation Ship 
 1970: Leslie Norris for Ransoms
 1971: Geoffrey Hill for Mercian Hymns
 1972: Paul Evans for February
 1973: Rodney Pybus for In Memoriam Milena
 1974: Allen Fisher for Place and Bill Griffiths for War With Windsor
 1975: Elizabeth Ashworth for A New Confusion
 1976: Lee Harwood for HMS Little Fox and Andrew Crozier for Pleats
 1977: Kit Wright for The Bear Looked Over the Mountain
 1978: John Montague for The Great Cloak
 1979: Simon Lowy for Melusine and the Negredo
 1980: John Whitworth for Unhistorical Fragments
 1981: Thomas McCarthy for The Sorrow Garden and Carol Rumens for Unplayed Music
 1982: Medbh McGuckian for Venus in the Rain and The Flower Master
 1983: David Constantine for Watching for Dolphins
 1984: Alison Fell for Kisses for Mayakovsky and Paul Hyland for The Stubborn Forest
 1985: Vikram Seth for The Humble Administrator's Garden and John Davies for The Visitor's Book
 1986: Helen Dunmore for The Sea Skater
 1987: Sujata Bhatt for Brunizem

See also
List of British literary awards
British poetry
List of poetry awards
List of years in poetry
List of years in literature

References

English literary awards
British poetry awards
Awards established in 1966
1966 establishments in the United Kingdom